VCFL may refer to the following terms:

 Victorian Country Football League, a governing body for Australian rules football
 Virginia-Carolina Football League, a professional American football league